Daniel Gimeno Traver was the defending champion, but chose not to participate that year.
Thiemo de Bakker won in the final 7–5, 6–0, against Pere Riba.

Seeds

  Thiemo de Bakker (champion)
  Pere Riba (final)
  Kamil Čapkovič (first round)
  Carles Poch Gradin (first round)
  Íñigo Cervantes-Huegun (first round)
  Pablo Santos (Quarterfinal)
  Miguel Ángel López Jaén (first round)
  Raemon Sluiter (second round)

Draw

Final four

Top half

Bottom half

References
Main Draw
Qualifying Singles

2009 ATP Challenger Tour
2009,Singles